The Muraenolepididae is a family of cod-like fish, known as eel cods, found in southern oceans.

References

Gadiformes